Prof. Dr. Maria Antonia Astrid Sunarti Susanto (also known as Astrid Susanto-Sunario) -- deputy chairwoman of Commission I of the Indonesian legislature, the People's Representative Council—was born 4 January 1936 in Makassar, South Celebes (now South Sulawesi), Dutch East Indies (now Indonesia) and died on 13 April 2006 in Jakarta. She was also a professor in the Department of International Relations at the University of Indonesia.

Dr. Susanto received her M. Phil. at the University of Münster, then-West Germany, in 1960 and a Ph.D. in Mass Communications at the Free University of Berlin in 1964.

Career

 Dean of the publication faculty, Padjajaran University, Bandung (1971–1975)
 Adjunct Professor, Communications and Developmental Sociology, University of Indonesia (1976–2006)
 Head of the Bureau of the Study of Cultures in the Ministry of National Development  (1974–1983)
 Asistent Minister in the Ministry of Development (1983–1988)
 Member, People's Consultative Assembly from Utusan Golongan (1987–1992)
 Member, PDKB DPR/MPR faction (2002)
 Member, Kesatuan Bangsa Kebangsaan Indonesia (F-KKI) faction (2002–2004)
 Adjunct Professor, in the post graduate program (S-2 dan S-3) - University of Indonesia, Jakarta; Sahid University, Jakarta; and Hasannudin University, Makassar

Family
Dr. Susanto was the second daughter of Prof. Mr. Soenario, S.H. (1902–1997), a former Indonesian minister of foreign affairs, and Dina Maria Geraldine Maranta (née Pantouw) Soenario (?-1995). Her husband was Ir. Bambang Susanto. She was survived by two sons, one daughter and two grandchildren.

Dr. Susanto's older sister is Prof. Dr. Sunaryati Hartono, vice-chairman of the National Ombudsman Commission of Indonesia. Another sister, Sunardien, is an economist. Her youngest sister, Wuryastuti Sunario, is managing director of the Indonesia Tourism Promotion Board. A younger brother, Irawan Sunario, lives in Jakarta.

Bibliography
 The Mass Communication System in Indonesia (1974) ASIN B0006XEDWM
 (With Simeon Itlay, Benny Hilapok, Nico Aso-Iokobal, Herman Peters and Frans Lieshout) Kebudayaan Jayawijaya dalam pembangunan bangsa (Culture of Kabupaten Jayawijaya with modernization process and traditional value system; papers of a seminar) (1993) 
 Pembangunan masyarakat pedesaan: Suatu telaah analitis masyarakat Wamena, Irian Jaya (Study on socio-culture of Dani and Baliem ethnic groups in the context of rural community development in Wamena, Irian Jaya Province) (1994) 
 Masyarakat Indonesia memasuki abad ke dua puluh satu (Social, political, and cultural conditions of Indonesia in the 21st century) (1999)

Notes and references

1936 births
2006 deaths
People from Makassar
Javanese people
Minahasa people
Sastrowardoyo family
Indonesian Christians
University of Münster alumni
Free University of Berlin alumni
Members of the People's Representative Council
Indonesian writers
Indonesian women writers